Mazhan may refer to these places:

Mazhan, Shandong, in Yishui County, Shandong, China
Mazhan, Zhejiang, in Cangnan County, Zhejiang, China
Mazhan Township, Tengchong, Yunnan, China
Mazhan, Iran, a village in Jolgeh-e Mazhan District, Khusf County, South Khorasan, Iran